Russell "Russ" Castronovo (born October 22, 1965) is Tom Paine Professor of English and Dorothy Draheim Professor of American Studies at the University of Wisconsin–Madison. He is also director of the university's Center for the Humanities.

Bibliography 

 Propaganda 1776: Secrets, Leaks, and Revolutionary Communications in Early America, 2014
 The Oxford Handbook to Nineteenth-Century American Literature, 2012
 Beautiful Democracy: Aesthetics and the Anarchy of Global Culture, 2007
 Necro Citizenship: Death, Eroticism, and the Public Sphere in the Nineteenth-Century United States, 2001
 Fathering the Nation: American Genealogies of Slavery and Freedom, 1995

References

External links 
 

Living people
Writers from Madison, Wisconsin
University of Wisconsin–Madison faculty
1965 births